The Ven. Harry John Morgan (16 November 1871 – 30 October 1947) was the Archdeacon of Bangor from 1937 to 1947.

Morgan was educated at Christ College, Brecon, and Brasenose College, Oxford. He served curacies at Llanfairpwllgwyngyll and Beaumaris, then incumbencies at Barmouth and Llandegfan. He was  a Canon Residentiary at Bangor Cathedral from 1930 until his death and its Chancellor from 1934.

References

1871 births
People educated at Christ College, Brecon
Alumni of Brasenose College, Oxford
Archdeacons of Bangor
1947 deaths